Victoria Park is a suburban area of Manchester, England. Victoria Park lies approximately two miles south of Manchester city centre, between Rusholme and Longsight.

History and description
In 1836, a unique enterprise was undertaken by Richard Lane and Partners, architects. This was to establish a residential area to the east of Wilmslow Road, an "estate" of substantial houses in spacious grounds, where prosperous business and professional families could live. Lane was already noted for his public work in the neo-classical style, for example his town hall building at Chorlton on Medlock. The facade of this building remains on the Manchester Metropolitan University All Saints' Campus and formed part of the Mabel Tylecote Building.

The early years of the 'Victoria Park Company' were of mixed fortune. The original plans to develop land in a slightly different area, did not reach complete fruition, largely due to the fraud which led to the Foss v. Harbottle case. A cul-de-sac of villas was built opposite Whitworth Park, and these were later demolished for the construction of the Royal Infirmary. The fraud, or rather a complex connected series of frauds, related to the original development along Moss Lane East. Drainage techniques of the time were insufficient to support the developers' ambitions, and the large tranche of land they owned was not built on until several decades later. Some of the original villas remain on the southern side of Moss Lane East, between Wilmslow Road and Monton Street. They are attractive and spacious buildings.

The focus of the second, successful phase shifted to the better-quality land now known as Victoria Park. Professional people moved into the large houses, and from the earliest days a wide variety of nationalities was represented, notably a wealthy Prussian and Chinese merchant community. It had its own tollgates, walls and police. By 1850 about 50 houses by various architects had been built. Some villas and the sedate atmosphere of the area began to change at the beginning of the 20th century. After a long period of social disintegration, which began as early as 1920, the area has become more established and is now made up of a mixture of university residences, and rented and private accommodation. In March 1972, Manchester City Council designated a Conservation Area in Victoria Park.

Individual buildings
The area has over 20 listed buildings and among its many significant buildings is the notable Grade I listed First Church of Christ, Scientist (now the Edgar Wood Centre) in Daisy Bank Road, the work of the Middleton architect Edgar Wood. Also of significance are Summerville on Daisy Bank Road; Hirstwood by Edward Salomons; Alfred Waterhouse's Xaverian College; and St Chrysostom's Church, the Anglican parish church designed by George T Redmayne at the corner of Oxford Place and Anson Road. St Chrysostom's Church backs onto the University of Manchester's Dalton-Ellis Hall, one of the older halls of residence at the university of Manchester Redmayne was the architect of the original Dalton Hall.

The Chinese Consulate-General is also located in a large mansion in Victoria Park, as is that of Pakistan.

Victoria Park Campus of the university comprises several halls of residence. Among these are Hulme Hall (including Burkhardt House), St Anselm Hall with Canterbury Court, Dalton-Ellis Hall, the former St Gabriel's Hall and Opal Gardens Hall. Hulme Hall contains grade II listed buildings designed by Percy Worthington in the arts and crafts style, and is the oldest hall of residence for the university, having opened in 1887 and moved to Victoria Park in 1907.

Church history
A church was included in the line drawings issued by Lane in 1836. The building was started in the 1840s but was abandoned because the Victoria Park Company went bankrupt. Victoria Park was from 1850 included in the parish of St James, Birch, until 1878, when the new parish of St John Chrysostom was created from parts of the parish of St James and other parishes.

Notable residents
Ford Madox Brown, artist
Richard Cobden, political activist
Elizabeth Gaskell, novelist
Winston Graham, novelist
George Hadfield, politician
Charles Hallé, musician
Gerald Bernard Kaufman, politician
Emmeline Pankhurst, suffragette
Richard Pankhurst, politician
Genesis P-Orridge, performance artist and occultist
Edward Salomons, architect
Sir Arthur Schuster, physicist

See also
 Victoria Baths
 Greygarth Hall

References

Further reading
Cronin, Jill & Rhodes, Frank (2006) Rusholme and Victoria Park. Stroud: Tempus 
[Leech, E. Bosdin] (1937) A Short Account of the Victoria Park, Manchester. Manchester: Victoria Park Committee, in commemoration of the centenary of the opening of the park on 31 July 1837
Spiers, Maurice (1976) Victoria Park, Manchester: a nineteenth-century suburb in its social and administrative context. (Remains ... 3rd series; vol. 23.) Manchester: Manchester University Press for the Chetham Society 
Spiers, Maurice (1961) Victoria Park, Manchester: a study of its administration and its relations with local government, 1836–1954. Thesis (M.A.) - University of Manchester

External links
 St Chrysostom's Church
 Manchester City Council: Victoria Park Conservation Area
Rusholme & Victoria Park Archive; Bruce Anderson

Areas of Manchester
Buildings and structures in Manchester